Aedophron phlebophora is a moth of the family Noctuidae. It is found in Turkey, Iraq, Iran, Armenia and the Levant (recorded from Syria, Jordan and Israel).

Adults are on wing from June to July. There is one generation per year.

The larvae feed on Phlomis species.

External links
 Heliothinae of Israel

Heliothinae
Insects of Turkey
Moths of the Middle East
Moths described in 1858